DFI Retail Group Holdings Limited (formerly known as Dairy Farm International Holdings Limited) is a Hong Kong-based retail company with legal bases in Bermuda and Singapore. A subsidiary of the Jardine Matheson Group, it is a major East and Southeast Asian retailer involved in the processing and wholesaling of food and health and beauty products. Jardine Strategic, a publicly listed holding company, has an attributable 78 percent stake in the firm.  It is listed on the London Stock Exchange, with secondary listings on the Singapore Exchange (SGX) and Bermuda Stock Exchange (BSX).

The head office is in the Devon House in Taikoo Place, Quarry Bay, Hong Kong.

As of 31 December 2020, the Group, its associates and joint ventures operated over 9,997 outlets; Wellcome/Food World (supermarkets), a controlling stake in Maxim's Catering (foodservice), Cold Storage (supermarkets), Jasons Market Place/Market Place by Jasons/Jasons Food Hall (high end supermarkets), Giant (hypermarkets), Hero (supermarkets), Mannings/Guardian (health and beauty) stores; it also operates 7-Eleven (convenience stores) throughout the region, and IKEA (home furnishings) stores in Hong Kong, Macau, Indonesia and Taiwan.

The group and its associates and joint ventures operated over 9,997 outlets, employed over 220,000 people and had total annual sales in excess of US$28.2 billion.

History

Dairy Farm was set up in 1886 by Sir Patrick Manson, a Scottish surgeon, and five well known Hong Kong businessmen. They initially aimed to improve the health of Hong Kong people by providing them with non-contaminated cows' milk and to import a herd of dairy cattle so as to decrease the price of milk by more than half. The farm was located in Pok Fu Lam.

In 1890, Dairy Farm built a low-rise brick and stucco building on Lower Albert Road in Central for use as a cold storage warehouse. This warehouse was later renovated and expanded in 1913 to include a dairy shop, a room for meat smoking, a cold storage room for winter clothes and residency for its manager. The building later evolved into the company headquarters until the company moved in the 1970s. The abandoned building was acquired by the Hong Kong Fringe Club, a non-profit-making arts organisation in 1984, and has been carefully restored. This distinctive 19th century building, now known as the Old Dairy Farm Depot, is a well-known landmark in Central providing a wide variety of cultural activities and performances.

In 1904, Dairy Farm began importing frozen meat and opened its first retail store at the Central District depot. The second Dairy Farm store was established on Nathan Road, Kowloon towards the end of the war in 1918. Amongst other things, this store provided fishing boats in Hong Kong with large amounts of ice.

In 1960, Dairy Farm and Lane Crawford formed a merged food retailing operations and renamed these supermarkets as Dairy Lane under Dairy Lane Limited. This joint business was undone by the acquisition of the Wellcome chain in 1964.

In 1972, Dairy Farm was acquired by Hong Kong Land, a Jardines subsidiary. In 1986 Dairy Farm was relisted on the Hong Kong Stock Exchange after it was demerged from Hong Kong Land. Dairy Farm acquired a 50% interest in Maxim's at the same time from Hong Kong Land. The 7-Eleven convenience store chain in Hong Kong and Singapore was acquired from Jardine Matheson in 1989.

Since 1999, Dairy Farm has continued to expand its footprint by acquiring supermarket and other retail operations in Taiwan, Malaysia, Singapore and Indonesia. Notably, it also acquired IKEA Hong Kong, Taiwan in 2002 and began Ikea's Indonesian operation in 2014.

In May 2012, Dairy Farm bought a 50% stake in the Rustan Supercenters, Inc., the Rustan group's supermarket chain. 36% came from the Tantoco family and 14% from the Spinnaker group. Its holdings increased to 64% in 2015 and 100% in 2017. On March 23, 2018, the entire stake was sold to Robinsons Retail Holdings, Inc. through a stock swap, yielding Dairy Farm 18.25% of Robinsons Retail Holdings, Inc. stock. In 2018, therefore, Rustan Supercenters are fully acquired by Robinsons Retail Holdings the 20.00% of which is owned by Mulgrave Corporation and GCH Investments, wholly owned subsidiaries of Dairy Farm.

As of June 2011, Dairy Farm is 78% owned by Jardine Matheson Holdings.

In August 2021, Dairy Farm rebranded its trading name to DFI Retail Group. On 5 May 2022, the company subsequently changed its legal name to DFI Retail Group Holdings Limited, effectively phased out the Dairy Farm branding.

Discontinued operations
In 1998, Dairy Farm sold out its 49% interest in Nestlé Dairy Farm, set up in 1992 to develop dairy products factories throughout China, to Nestlé; on the merger of Kwik Save with Somerfield, Dairy Farm sold its 11% holding for US$290 million. Dairy Farm acquired 25% of the "No Frills" Kwik Save Group in 1987; Sold the 108-store Simago chain in Spain acquired in 1990.
In March 2000, Dairy Farm sold its half share in DFI Géant, the Taiwan hypermarket opened in 1998 back to Casino, its joint venture partner.
In 2001, the company sold the 287-store Franklins chain in Australia which it acquired in 1978. Its Hong Kong-based distribution business, Sims Trading, was sold to CITIC Pacific.
In June 2002, the 61-store Woolworths chain in New Zealand acquired in 1990, was sold for US$337 million.
In 2004, the Group's Hong Kong ice manufacturing business which began in 1918 was sold for US$107 million.

Controversy 
Wellcome, a major food retailer owned by Dairy Farm Group, have been cited by the Taiwanese government for 33 labor violations in Taiwan. These include instances of maintaining unsafe work spaces that potentially endangered employees, having staff members work unpaid overtime beyond legal limitations, and refusing pay and rest time to employees.

See also
 The Hongs
 Wellcome/Food World
 Maxim's
 Cold Storage
 Jasons Market Place/Market Place by Jasons
 Giant
 Mannings/Guardian
 Rustan's

References

External links

 

 
Dairy products companies of Hong Kong
Jardine Matheson Group
Retail companies established in 1886
Companies formerly listed on the Hong Kong Stock Exchange
Former companies in the Hang Seng Index
Retail companies of Hong Kong
Companies listed on the London Stock Exchange
Companies listed on the Singapore Exchange
1973 mergers and acquisitions